Mosharraf Hossain ( – 7 February 2010) was a Bangladeshi freedom fighter politician from Netrokona belonging to Bangladesh Awami League. He was elected twice as a member of the Jatiya Sangsad.

Biography
Hossain was elected as a  member of the Jatiya Sangsad from Mymensingh-13 constituency in 1979. Later, he was elected as a member of the Jatiya Sangsad from Mymensingh With Netrokona constituency in 1991.

Hossain died on 7 February 2010 at Renaissance Hospital in Dhaka.

References

1940s births
2010 deaths
People from Netrokona District
2nd Jatiya Sangsad members
5th Jatiya Sangsad members
Awami League politicians